The 1930 Arkansas Razorbacks football team represented the University of Arkansas in the Southwest Conference (SWC) during the 1930 college football season. In their second year under head coach Fred Thomsen, the Razorbacks compiled a 3–6 record (2–2 against SWC opponents), finished in fifth place in the SWC, and were outscored by their opponents by a combined total of 154 to 78.

Schedule

References

Arkansas
Arkansas Razorbacks football seasons
Arkansas Razorbacks football